Arthroleptis schubotzi, also known as the Burundi screeching frog, Schubotz's squeaker, and Kivu dwarf litter frog, is a species of frog in the family Arthroleptidae. It is found in the African Rift Valley in eastern Democratic Republic of the Congo (Kivu), southwestern Tanzania, Burundi, Rwanda, and western Uganda. There are taxonomic problems in delimiting this species.

Etymology
The specific name honours the German zoologist Johann G. Hermann Schubotz (1881–1955).

Description
A. schubotzi is a very small Arthroleptis species: adult males measure  and adult females  in snout–vent length. The tympanum is distinct and half the size of the eye. The legs are short. The belly is pigmented. Colouration is cryptic and commonly involves a dark spot on the head. Males have a black throat.

The male advertisement call is a harsh series of double chirps.

Habitat and conservation
It is an adaptable leaf-litter species. It breeds by direct development, (i.e., there is no free-living larval stage) thereby not depending on water.

Specific threats to this species are unknown, but it probably will not tolerate complete opening of its habitat. It is occurs in the Virunga National Park in the Democratic Republic of Congo and in the Kibale and Bwindi National Parks in Uganda.

References

schubotzi
Frogs of Africa
Amphibians of Burundi
Amphibians of the Democratic Republic of the Congo
Amphibians of Rwanda
Amphibians of Tanzania
Amphibians of Uganda
Taxa named by Fritz Nieden
Amphibians described in 1911
Taxonomy articles created by Polbot